Oman Avenues Mall is one of  the largest shopping malls in Oman. It is a division of renowned LuLu Group International based at Abu Dhabi. It was inaugurated in May 2015, under the patronage of M.A Yusuff Ali, MD, Lulu Group, along with other key members of the Lulu management.

References

External links 
 

Shopping malls in Oman